Pelicaria vermis, known as the small ostrich foot shell or takai in Māori, is a species of sea snail, a marine gastropod mollusc in the family Struthiolariidae. It is the only extant species in the genus.

Distribution & Habitat
This species is endemic to the North Island of New Zealand, where it lives just beneath the surface on tidal flats and off sandy beaches, occasionally to depths of 90m.

Description
The shell height is up to 54 mm, and width up to 35 mm, colouring usually yellow brown, rarely plain yellow or purple.

References

 Lamarck, [J.-B. M.] de. (1822). Histoire naturelle des animaux sans vertèbres. Tome septième. Paris: published by the Author, 711 pp
 Marwick, J. (1924). The Struthiolariidae. Transactions of the New Zealand Institute. 55: 161-190.
 Vella, P. (1953). The genus Pelicaria in the Tertiary of east Wairarapa. Transactions of the Royal Society of New Zealand. 81: 35-48.
 Neef, G. (1970). Notes on the subgenus Pelicaria. New Zealand Journal of Geology and Geophysics. 13: 436–476.
 Powell A. W. B., New Zealand Mollusca, William Collins Publishers Ltd, Auckland, New Zealand 1979

External links
  Martyn T. (1784-1787). The universal conchologist, exhibiting the figure of every known shells. London, published by the author. 4 vols. 40 pp., 80 pls.
  Gmelin J.F. (1791). Vermes. In: Gmelin J.F. (Ed.) Caroli a Linnaei Systema Naturae per Regna Tria Naturae, Ed. 13. Tome 1(6). G.E. Beer, Lipsiae
 Sowerby, G. B., I. (1821-1834). The genera of recent and fossil shells, for the use of students, in conchology and geology. Published in 42 numbers. Vol. 1, 
 Lamarck, [J.-B. M. de. (1822). Histoire naturelle des animaux sans vertèbres. Tome septième. Paris: published by the Author, 711 pp]
 
 

Struthiolariidae
Gastropods of New Zealand
Gastropods described in 1784